The Glenrock train wreck is the worst train wreck in Wyoming history, killing 30. It happened on the Chicago, Burlington and Quincy Railroad between Glenrock and Casper on September 27, 1923. (The nearest current community is Meadow Acres, lying west of the site, across the North Platte River). It occurred when the Casper to Denver train, only 15 miles into its journey, plunged into Cole Creek after the bridge spanning it had washed away after three days of storms.

The storms of September 27–29 caused flooding over much of central Wyoming and wrecked other railroad bridges, though none with such catastrophic results. Newspaper reporters from Denver who attempted to reach the site by road were still stranded 100 miles away on September 29.

The Wreck
The train concerned was operated jointly by the Burlington and the Colorado and Southern Railroad and comprised seven cars hauled by Colorado and Southern engine No. 350 (an F-3-A class 4-6-2 built by Baldwin in 1911 (serial number 35771). It had left Casper at 8:35 p.m., due in Denver at 10 a.m. the following day. According to the official ICC report, it was traveling at a speed between  when it reached bridge 98 crossing Cole Creek; the bridge being on a curve was not visible to the headlights of the train until it was too late. The only surviving member of the train or engine crew stated that the emergency brakes were only applied just before the train plunged off the rails.

After the accident, very little of the bridge structure remained. The engine ended up 'practically submerged in sand' the structure of the first car was completely destroyed; the next three cars ended up in the creek; the second and fourth on top of the third which was 'demolished'; the fifth car remained on the west bank with one end submerged; although it finally fell into the torrent.

The Rescue
A rescue train from Casper arrived at the scene at 11 p.m. and found over 20 people stranded on top of a sleeping car 'begging to be rescued'. The Dallas Morning News reported "A cable rope obtained from the Big Muddy oil field was thrown over to the marooned sleepers. With the headlight of the relief train playing on the scene, the slow process of rescue in this manner proceeded. Several times women lost one hand-hold of the rope, only to regain their balance and save themselves from dropping into the sweeping waters. After their perilous trip across the water, several women fell into a dead faint and had to be carried to waiting cars. A man carried a baby in his arms from the marooned car to the bank and almost miraculously effected a rescue".

Due to heavy rains in the area, the line had been inspected by the section foreman. It was several days before the current subsided enough to recover the bodies of all of the victims from the submerged coaches. In all, 30 of the 66 people aboard the train were killed in the accident.

References

Railway accidents and incidents in Wyoming
Transportation disasters in Wyoming
Passenger rail transportation in Wyoming
Bridge disasters caused by scour damage
Bridge disasters in the United States
Accidents and incidents involving Chicago, Burlington and Quincy Railroad
Converse County, Wyoming
Railway accidents in 1923
1923 in Wyoming
September 1923 events